The 38th International Film Festival of India was held from November 23 - December 3 2007 in Goa. Hungarian cinema was the "Country Focus" in this edition. Filmmaker Buddhadeb Dasgupta
was the chief guest for this edition.

Winners
Golden Peacock (Best Film):  "The Wall" by "Lin Chih Ju" (Taiwanese film)
Life Time Achievement Award - "Dilip Kumar" and "Lata Mangeshkar"
Silver Peacock Special Jury Award: Director: to "Golam Rabanny Biplab" for "On The Wings of Dreams"  (Bangladeshi film)
Silver Peacock Special Jury Award: Actress: to Julia Urbini for "More Than Anything In The World"  (Mexican film)
Silver Peacock Award for the Most Promising Asian Director:"Pongpat Wachirabunjong" for "Me... Myself" (Thai film).

Official selections

Special screenings

Opening film
"4 months, 3 weeks and 2 days" by "Cristian Mungiun" (Romanian film).

Closing film
"Fados" by "Carlos Saura" (Portugal-Spain film).

References

2007 film festivals
38th
2007 in Indian cinema